Experimentalfältet ("the field for experiments") was an area in Frescati in northern Stockholm that was used by the Royal Swedish Academy of Agriculture and Forestry from the early 19th century until the 1960s. In the 1960s its mission was changed, when the new campus of Stockholm University was installed on the fields. The former Roslagsbanan railway station Universitetet used to be called Experimentalfältet but changed its name when the university had been established there.

The activities of the Academy of Agriculture and Forestry have been transferred to an area in Ultuna outside Uppsala.

Sources
 Stockholm University: description of premises 
 Stockholmskallan: archive photo 
 KSLA: history of Experimentalfältet 
 Swedish National Heritage Board: listing

Further reading
 Lange, Ulrich, 2000: Experimentalfältet: Kungl. Lantbruksakademiens experiment- och försöksverksamhet på Norra Djurgården i Stockholm 1816-1907 (408 pp.) in the series Acta Universitatis agriculturae Sueciae. Agraria, 1401-6249, 225. Uppsala: Swedish Univ. of Agricultural Sciences (Sveriges lantbruksuniv.)  (LIBRIS catalogue entry and abstract) )

Stockholm University
Agriculture in Sweden
Forestry in Sweden
Listed buildings in Stockholm